Ed McCabe was born in Chicago, Illinois in 1938. He is a founder of Scali, McCabe, Sloves, an American advertising agency of the 1960s and 1970s. In 1974, he was elected to the One Club Hall of Fame at the age of 34. He remains the youngest person ever elected to the One Club Hall of Fame. He wrote several of the iconic ad campaigns of his era, including the Perdue Chicken, Volvo and Maxell advertising efforts.

In 1987 he retired from the firm he founded to compete in the gruelling Paris-Dakar auto race. He subsequently wrote the book Against Gravity about this experience. In 1991 he founded McCabe & Company in New York City. He now spends his time between New York City and his home in Marblehead, MA.

References

External links
 An interview with Mr.Edward McCabe (interviewed in 1968)
 Real 'Mad Men' Pitched Safety to Sell Volvos - The New York Times - MARCH 23, 2012

1939 births
Living people
Businesspeople from Chicago
American advertising executives
Businesspeople from Miami
20th-century American businesspeople